Making Plans for Lena is a 2009 French drama film directed by Christophe Honoré, who co-wrote the screenplay with Geneviève Brisac. It stars Chiara Mastroianni, Marina Foïs, Marie-Christine Barrault, and Jean-Marc Barr. It was released on 2 September 2009 in France.

Plot
Lena, a single mother of two young children, takes a trip from Paris to Brittany to spend a holiday with her family at the country house. Lena's ex-husband Nigel and her love interest Simon visits them.

Cast
 Chiara Mastroianni as Léna
 Marina Foïs as Frédérique
 Marie-Christine Barrault as Annie
 Jean-Marc Barr as Nigel
 Louis Garrel as Simon
 Fred Ulysse as Michel
 Marcial Di Fonzo Bo as Thibault
 Alice Butaud as Elise
 Julien Honoré as Gulven
 Donatien Suner as Anton
 Lou Pasquerault as Augustine
 Jean-Baptiste Fonck as José

Release
The film was released on 2 September 2009 in France. It was also screened at the 2009 San Sebastián International Film Festival, the 2009 São Paulo International Film Festival, the 2010 San Francisco International Film Festival, and the 2010 Transilvania International Film Festival.

Reception
At Rotten Tomatoes, the film holds an approval rating of 50% based on 8 reviews, and an average rating of 5.19/10.

Ed Gonzalez of Slant Magazine gave the film 2.5 out of 4 stars, writing: "With [André] Téchiné-like expertise, Honoré delicately weaves together the dramas of his characters' lives." He added: "Though those dramas aren't always interesting (one could even say the character of Frédérique is completely beside the point), Making Plans for Lena is a gorgeous tapestry nonetheless." Jordan Mintzer of Variety wrote: "While Love Songs and Dans Paris revealed prolific filmmaker Christophe Honore to be a direct descendant of the French New Wave, he heads straight into Arnaud Desplechin territory with the turbulent family drama Making Plans for Lena." Meanwhile, Frank Scheck of The Hollywood Reporter commented that "Mastroianni provides a vividly intense turn in the title role, but the film's narrative diffuseness and excessive stylization defeats her best efforts." He called it "a misstep from one of that country's most acclaimed filmmakers."

At the 35th César Awards, Alex Beaupain was nominated for the Best Original Music award.

References

External links
 

2009 films
French drama films
2000s French-language films
Films directed by Christophe Honoré